India Against Corruption (IAC) is an anti-corruption movement in India which was particularly prominent during the anti-corruption protests of 2011 and 2012, concerned with the introduction of the Jan Lokpal bill. It primarily sought to mobilise the masses in support of their demands. Divisions amongst key members of the IAC's core committee eventually led to a split within the movement- Arvind Kejriwal left to form the Aam Aadmi Party, while Anna Hazare left to form Jantantra Morcha.

Rise 
The IAC popular protest movement began in 2011 as part of a larger wave of demonstrations and protests. The official position of figureheads in the IAC movement was that it had no formal organisation beyond a 24-member core committee. In 2011, the organisers of IAC determined to launch a campaign to mobilise the masses in support of a demand-the creation of a Lokpal (ombudsman) who would have powers to arrest and charge government officials accused of corruption., that they hoped would help to bring about a corruption-free India. The campaign gained strength through social media, building a massive network of supporters. Initially, they approached Ramdev, a populist Indian yogi to be the figurehead for this campaign but his connections to the right-wing Sangh Parivar threatened to damage the credibility of what was perceived as an apolitical movement. This led to him being replaced by Anna Hazare, a veteran social reformer. Hazare, too, brought a large support base with him, described by Meera Nanda as being largely "from urban middle-classes and idealistic youth". The urban sophistication of Hazare, compared to Ramdev's rusticity, attracted high-profile support for the campaign from Bollywood stars, the internet-savvy, and mainstream English-language news media.

Prominent members 

 Anna Hazare
 Arvind Kejriwal
 Kiran Bedi
 Kumar Vishwas
 Manish Sisodia

Internal split 
In 2012, the IAC began to splinter with Hazare's followers coming to be known as Team Anna. By late 2012, the split had deepened, caused by differences of opinion among the central figures regarding the IAC's lack of practical success and its unwillingness to be directly engaged in the political system. An IAC survey of the masses suggested that direct involvement in politics was preferable, leading to Arvind Kejriwal and some others splitting to form the Aam Aadmi Party (AAP) in order to cause change from within the system. Hazare rejected the survey findings.

In August 2012, Hazare announced that he was disbanding Team Anna, around the time that the divisions were coming to a head. 

In November 2012, after the split, he said that he was forming a new Team Anna, that it would retain the label of India Against Corruption and that its members were discussing other societal issues to be addressed.

The new Team Anna, sometimes referred to as Team Anna 2.0, prepared to tour the country from 30 January 2013, coinciding with the death anniversary of Mahatma Gandhi. 

On 30 January 2013, Hazare announced that he had formed Jantantra Morcha, a campaigning group that included the previously-named members of Team Anna 2.0 and which he considered to be a replacement for IAC but with a broader agenda.

Criticism 
Historian and commentator Ramachandra Guha has questioned the image that has been presented of IAC and of Hazare. Acknowledging that Hazare had previously been successful in campaigns for infrastructure reforms at the local level in his native Maharashtra and that the IAC campaign of 2011 had an impact, Guha doubts the claims that the 2011 and 2012 protests overwhelmingly engaged the masses. He notes that liberals were concerned with a perceived anti-democratic rhetoric while socially oppressed communities, such as the dalits and Other Backward Classes, were worried that the "savarna" led movement would undermine the gains they have made through legislative reforms, such as those resulting from the Mandal Commission. He considers that the attention given to the protest by 24-hour news channels and internet resources has masked the realities, such as that popular participation at the Jantar Mantar and Ramlila Maidan protests in Delhi was a fraction of that evidenced in Kolkata in 1998 when 400,000 marched in an anti-nuclear movement. Guha further said that scandals, such as the 2G spectrum case, were high-profile examples of the endemic corruption prevalent in Indian society at all levels but the IAC solution — the Lokpal — was only a "simplistic" reaction.

See also 
 Corruption in India

References

External links 

Official website

Political advocacy groups in India
Anti-corruption activism in India